Heraclio Eder Sánchez Terán (born 21 May 1986 in Tlalnepantla de Baz, Estado de México) is a Mexican race walker. He has competed at the World Championships in Athletics five times (2005 to 2011) and represented his country at the 2008 Beijing Olympics and the 2012 London Olympics. He is currently serving the Mexican Army, and has won the Mexican 'Premio Nacional del Deporte'. He holds the Mexican record for walking over 5 km and 10 km. His best for the 20 km distance is 1:18:34 hours.

Sánchez was active in international walking competitions as a junior (under-20) athlete. He was the silver medallist over 10 km at the 2003 Pan American Junior Athletics Championships, was runner-up to Sun Chao at the 2004 IAAF World Race Walking Cup, then took the 10,000 m walk title at the 2004 CAC Junior Championships. He came fourth in the 10,000 m walk at the 2004 World Junior Championships in Athletics.

In 2005 he moved up to the senior 20 kilometres walk distance and placed eighth in that event at the 2005 World Championships in Athletics. He failed to finish at the 2006 IAAF World Race Walking Cup, but won a silver medal at the 2006 Central American and Caribbean Games behind Luis Fernando López. He improved his placing at the 2007 World Championships in Athletics with a fourth-place finish and reached his first global senior podium at the 2008 IAAF World Race Walking Cup, taking the bronze medal with a personal best time of 1:18:34 hours. He managed only 15th at the 2008 Summer Olympics later that year however. He did win a gold medal at the 2008 NACAC Under-23 Championships in Athletics that season though.

Sánchez was the bronze medallist at the 2009 World Championships in Athletics in a time of 1:19:22 hours. He came sixth in the 20 km walk at the 2010 IAAF World Race Walking Cup held in Mexico and won the regional title at the 2010 Central American and Caribbean Games in a games record time. The year after he came sixth at the 2011 Pan American Games and was 15th at the 2011 World Championships in Athletics.

He competed on the 2012 IAAF World Race Walking Challenge circuit and won at the Chihuahua meeting in his native Mexico in March.  At the 2012 Summer Olympics, he finished in 6th place.

Personal bests

Achievements

References

External links
 
 

1986 births
Living people
Mexican male racewalkers
Athletes (track and field) at the 2008 Summer Olympics
Athletes (track and field) at the 2012 Summer Olympics
Athletes (track and field) at the 2011 Pan American Games
Olympic athletes of Mexico
Sportspeople from the State of Mexico
People from Tlalnepantla de Baz
World Athletics Championships medalists
World Athletics Championships athletes for Mexico
Central American and Caribbean Games gold medalists for Mexico
Competitors at the 2006 Central American and Caribbean Games
Competitors at the 2010 Central American and Caribbean Games
Central American and Caribbean Games medalists in athletics
Pan American Games competitors for Mexico
21st-century Mexican people